A specialist school or specialised school is a type of school which specialises in a certain area or field of curriculum.

Specialist school may also refer to:

 Special school, a type of school for students with special educational needs
 Specialist schools in the United Kingdom, an article about specialist schools in the United Kingdom
 Specialised independent school, a type of specialist school in Singapore
 Religious school, a type of school with a religious focus